Prokhorov or Prokhorova (feminine), is a common Russian surname which may refer to:

Alexander Prokhorov (1916–2002), Russian physicist and Nobel Prize winner
Aleksandr Prokhorov (footballer) (1946–2005), Soviet football player and coach
Alexey Prokhorov (1923–2002), Soviet aircraft pilot and twice Hero of the Soviet Union
Anton Prokhorov (b. 1992), Russian Paralympic athlete
Anatoly Prokhorov (1948–2020), Soviet and Russian film and television producer
Mikhail Prokhorov (b. 1965), Russian billionaire businessman, politician and US investor
Nikita Prokhorov (born 1991), Russian Paralympic athlete
Nikolay Prokhorov (1924–2008), Soviet army officer and Hero of the Soviet Union
Vasily Prokhorov (1906–1971), Soviet politician, Chairman of the Supreme Soviet of Russia
Vasily Prokhorov (1919–1955), Soviet army officer and Hero of the Soviet Union
Vitali Prokhorov (b. 1966), professional hockey player
Vladimir Prokhorov (b. 1984), Russian luger
Yelena Prokhorova (b. 1978), Russian heptathlete
Yuri Vasilevich Prokhorov (1929–2013), Russian mathematician
Lévy–Prokhorov metric
Prokhorov's theorem

Russian-language surnames